Love Broker is an American reality documentary television series on Bravo. The series debuted on March 5, 2012 and follows Lori Zaslow as she creates love connections in New York City. On March 16, 2012, Bravo pulled the series from its broadcasting schedule due to low viewership. The series later returned on July 24, 2012.

Episodes

References

External links

2010s American reality television series
2012 American television series debuts
2012 American television series endings
English-language television shows
Bravo (American TV network) original programming